Free Geek is a technology related non-profit organization based in Portland, Oregon, launched on April 22, 2000. It started as a public event at Pioneer Courthouse Square. In September 2000, it opened a permanent facility as a drop off site for electronic waste. In January 2001, local newspaper The Oregonian ran an article advertising their free computer program for volunteers, which became so successful that they had to start a waiting list. They currently have over 2,000 active volunteers per year.

History
As part of the COVID-19 pandemic, the company received between $350,000 and $1 million in federally backed small business loan from Columbia State Bank as part of the Paycheck Protection Program. The company stated it would allow them to retain 47 jobs.

Activities

Free Geek provides free classes and work programs to its volunteers and the general public. Free Geek also offers phone and drop-in technical support for the computers it provides.

Build program 
Volunteers are trained to build and refurbish computers using parts recovered from donations. These computers are then sold online or at a store, donated in many of Free Geek's programs, or given to volunteers completing 24 hours of service.

Recycling, reuse, and resale 
Raw materials, such as electronics, are processed by volunteers, approximately 40% of it is reused. Some of it is sold, either online or in their store, where the proceeds are used to support educational and outreach programs. Any materials which cannot be reused are recycled as safely and sustainably as possible, in order to prevent it from entering the waste stream and damaging the environment. Free Geek also donates refurbished computers and technology directly back into the community; in 2017, for example, Free Geek was able to give away six laptop computers for every ten sold in their Store. In 2016, Free Geek donated 4,400 items of technology to low-income individuals, schools, and nonprofits.

Hardware Grant Program 

The Hardware Grant Program provides qualifying nonprofits and schools with refurbished desktop computers, laptops, printers, and other equipment. Since its inception, it has granted more than 10,500 items to over 2,000 nonprofits. 60% of grantees are based in the Portland Metro area.

Volunteers and internships 

Volunteers do the majority of work at Free Geek. Since its founding, over 20,500 people have volunteered. In 2016, over 2,000 active volunteers and interns volunteered over 47,500 hours.

The Volunteer Adoption Program offers a free computer to every volunteer after they have worked 24 hours of volunteer time. Each year Free Geek gives around 550 computers and necessary peripherals to volunteers who have completed 24 hours of service. 

Free Geek also offers 3-6 month internship programs for skilled volunteers 16 years and up, designed to help develop job skills to help them pursue tech sector careers and make connections in the community.

Plug Into Portland 

Plug Into Portland is a partnership between Free Geek and Portland Public Schools. It started in 2014, and expanded in 2017 to other school districts. It attempts to reduce the digital divide, which hinders low-income students' learning because they do not have access to a computer at home. Students who volunteer for a total of 24 hours at any nonprofit organization in their community receive a free computer. It served approximately 100 low-income students and families in 2016.

Community education 

Free Geek offers free educational programs about technology to the community. Classes and workshops include such topics as basic digital literacy, "Anatomy of a Computer", programming with JavaScript and Python, web development, social media for organizations, data science, digital privacy and safety, graphic design, digital art, and workplace readiness. In 2016, Free Geek served nearly 1,700 students with over 4,000 classroom hours of instruction.

Free software
Free Geek's refurbished computers run Linux Mint and other free and open-source software. The use of free software gives a wide range of software without the need to manage licenses or payment.

Free Geek was a joint winner of the first Chris Nicol FOSS Prize awarded by the Association for Progressive Communications (APC) in 2007.

Locations
In addition to Portland, a number of other cities have started their own independent Free Geek organizations.

Fayetteville, Arkansas (Free Geek of Arkansas)
Athens, Georgia (Free I.T. Athens)
Chicago, Illinois (Free Geek Chicago) (Closed as of June 25th, 2022)
Detroit, Michigan (Motor City Free Geek)
Minneapolis-Saint Paul, Minnesota (Free Geek Twin Cities)
Oslo, Norway (Free Geek Norway)
Ephrata, Pennsylvania (Free Geek Penn)
Toronto, Ontario (Free Geek Toronto)
Vancouver, British Columbia (Free Geek Vancouver)(Closed November 30th, 2022)

See also

Empower Up
World Computer Exchange
 Digital divide in the United States
 Global digital divide
Computer recycling
Electronic waste in the United States

References

External links
Free Geek 
BoingBoing article
another BoingBoing article

Organizations established in 2000
Organizations based in Portland, Oregon
Non-profit organizations based in Oregon
Recycling organizations
Information technology charities
Electronic waste in the United States
2000 establishments in Oregon
Charities